Bisotun (also Romanized as Bīsotūn; also known as Bīsītan and Bīsītūn) is a city and capital of Bisotun District, in Harsin County, Kermanshah Province, Iran.  At the 2006 census, its population was 2,075, in 527 families.

The town is at the foot of Bisotun mountain, the flank of which is the location of an important historical site. The imperial road from Ekbatana to Babylon passed at the foot of the mountain. On the rocky slopes king Darius I left the Behistun Inscription. From the Seleucid epoch there is a Herakles statue. Next to it Parthian kings added some reliefs. Late Sasanian rulers prepared a large piece of rock for another victory relief which was never finished because of the subsequent Arab invasion. Later folklore connected this place to the legend of Farhad and Shirin.

A Safavid caravanserai is preserved in Bisotun.

References

External links

Populated places in Harsin County
Cities in Kermanshah Province